Guido Brignone (6 December 1886 – 6 March 1959) was an Italian film director and actor. He was the father of actress Lilla Brignone and younger brother of actress Mercedes Brignone.

Brignone was born in Milan, Italy. He was the first Italian Director to win the Venice Film Festival or Mostra Internazionale d'Arte Cinematografica, the oldest film festival in the world, with Best Italian Film, Teresa Confalonieri (1934).

He died in Rome in 1959.

Selected filmography
 Odette (1916)
 The Painting of Osvaldo Mars (1921)
 The Two Sergeants (1922)
 Emperor Maciste (1924)
 Saetta Learns to Live (1924)
 Maciste in Hell (1925)
 Maciste in the Lion's Cage (1926)
 The Giant of the Dolomites (1927)
 Mary's Big Secret (1928)
 Devotion (1929)
 The Man Without Love (1929)
 Before the Jury (1931)
 The Charmer (1931)
 La Wally (1932)
 Pergolesi (1932)
 Paradise (1932)
 Loyalty of Love (1934)
 Just Married (1934)
 Red Passport (1935)
 Ginevra degli Almieri (1935)
 The Ancestor (1936)
 To Live (1937)
 Marcella (1937)
 For Men Only (1938)
 Under the Southern Cross (1938)
 Kean (1940)
 Disturbance (1942)
 The Gorgon (1942)
 Maria Malibran (1943)
 Baron Carlo Mazza (1948)
 Buried Alive (1949)
 The Ungrateful Heart (1951)
 Deceit (1952)
 Storms (1953)
 Ivan, Son of the White Devil (1953)
 Sunset in Naples (1955)
 The Courier of Moncenisio (1956)

References

External links 
 

1886 births
1959 deaths
Italian film directors
Italian male film actors
Italian male silent film actors
20th-century Italian male actors
Male actors from Milan